Benthall is a small village in Shropshire, in England in the civil parish of Barrow. It is situated to the south of Telford, about a mile south of Ironbridge on the River Severn and almost contiguous with the town of Broseley.

See also
Listed buildings in Barrow, Shropshire
Salopian Art Pottery – art pottery made at Benthall, c.1880–1930

External links

Villages in Shropshire